Prionoceratoidea is a superfamily in the goniatitid suborder, Tornoceratatina that was extant during the latter Paleozoic.

The inclusive taxonomy of the Prionoceratoidea varies according to classification. In some, valid families are the Gattendorfiidae, Prionoceratidae, Pseudarietitidae, and Voehringeritidae. Others may add the Acrocanitidae, Cheiloceratidae,  Praeglyphioceratidae, and Sporadoceratidae to the list although it is not at all clear that these belong.

References
GONIAT - Prionocerataceae entry 11-28-11
Paleobiology Database - Prionocerataceae entry 11-28-11
Saunders, Work, and Nikolaeva, 1999. Evolution of Complexity in Paleozoic Ammonoid Sutures -Supplementary Material.  

 
Tornoceratina
Goniatitida superfamilies